Benjamin N. Lovejoy (born February 20, 1984) is an American former professional ice hockey defenseman. He most recently played for the Dallas Stars of the National Hockey League (NHL). He has also played for the Pittsburgh Penguins, the Anaheim Ducks and the New Jersey Devils.

His nickname "The Reverend" comes from The Simpsons character Reverend Lovejoy.

Playing career

Amateur
As a youth, Lovejoy played in the 1998 Quebec International Pee-Wee Hockey Tournament with the Middlesex Islanders minor ice hockey team.

Lovejoy played hockey at Cardigan Mountain School in Canaan, New Hampshire and then at Deerfield Academy in Deerfield, Massachusetts. The two programs have turned out numerous NCAA Division 1 standout players over the past two decades, many of whom have gone on to continue their playing careers in the NHL.

Undrafted by an NHL team, Lovejoy played one year for Boston College and three years for Dartmouth College of the NCAA's Hockey East and ECAC conferences, respectively. During his third year of collegiate hockey, he was offered a professional contract by the Montreal Canadiens, though he declined the offer in order to finish his degree and develop further as a player. Lovejoy also played lacrosse at Dartmouth, earning All-Ivy honors in 2006. He graduated from Dartmouth in 2006.

Professional
Lovejoy began his professional career immediately after his final collegiate season. and played five games with the Norfolk Admirals of the American Hockey League (AHL) to end the 2006–07 season. In the summer of 2007, Lovejoy signed an AHL contract with the Wilkes-Barre/Scranton Penguins, the top minor league affiliate of the Pittsburgh Penguins. He scored his first professional goal at home on March 17, 2008. Lovejoy ended the season with 20 points (two goals and 18 assists) from 72 games and recording a +16 plus-minus rating.

On July 7, 2008, Lovejoy signed an NHL contract with the Pittsburgh Penguins. On December 7, 2008, when a replacement was needed for Pittsburgh defenseman Hal Gill, Lovejoy received his first call-up to the NHL. At the time of his recall, he was ranked in the top ten amongst AHL defensemen in 14 points (four goals and ten assists) and placed in the top ten amongst all AHL players in plus minus, with +14 in 24 games. Lovejoy made his NHL debut on December 8, 2008, in a 4–3 loss against the Buffalo Sabres.

Lovejoy was named to the PlanetUSA squad for the 2009 AHL All-Star Classic, which was held January 25 and 26, 2009, at the DCU Center in Worcester, Massachusetts. During the Skills Competition, he took part in the hardest shot and breakaway challenges.

On April 11, 2009, Lovejoy received the Second Team AHL All-Star Award, as well as being named the League's top defenseman. He ended the regular 2008–09 season leading the entire AHL in plus-minus, with +42. He was called up during the playoffs by Pittsburgh as a spare player. Lovejoy did not play in the playoffs, but was included on the team picture, and awarded a Stanley Cup ring. Lovejoy only played 2 games for Pittsburgh in 2008–09, so he did not qualify to have his name stamped on the Stanley Cup.

Lovejoy notched his first NHL point with an assist during a 6–5 Penguins victory over the Boston Bruins on November 14, 2009. He scored his first NHL goal on December 22, 2010, against Scott Clemmensen of the Florida Panthers. In the same game, he took an opposing shot off of his cheek, causing massive swelling.

Shortly after the beginning of the lockout-shortened 2012–13 season, on February 6, 2013, Lovejoy was traded by the Penguins to the Anaheim Ducks in exchange for a fifth-round draft pick in 2014.

Prior to the beginning of 2013–14 season, Lovejoy, as an unrestricted free agent, re-signed with the Ducks on a three-year contract. On January 3, 2014, Lovejoy scored two first period goals against the Edmonton Oilers. The two goals were scored less than three minutes apart, establishing a new Ducks franchise record.

On March 2, 2015, Lovejoy was traded back to the Pittsburgh Penguins in exchange for defenseman Simon Després. In the 2015–16 season, Lovejoy contributed 4 goals and 10 points in 66 games before playing in all 24 post-season games en route to the Penguins' claiming their fourth Stanley Cup. Lovejoy became the first New Hampshire native to win the trophy.

On July 1, 2016, Lovejoy left as a free agent to sign a three-year contract with the New Jersey Devils.

In the final year of his contract with the Devils in the 2018–19 season, Lovejoy appeared in 51 games from the blueline adding 7 points while leading the team in shorthanded icetime. With the Devils out of playoff contention, on February 23, 2019, he was traded to the Dallas Stars in exchange for Connor Carrick and a third-round draft pick in 2019.

On August 29, 2019, Lovejoy announced his retirement from professional hockey on NHL Tonight.

Post-playing career

On August 29, 2019, Lovejoy announced his retirement from professional hockey on NHL Tonight. In 2020, he joined NHL on NBC as a replacement for Jeremy Roenick, who was fired in 2020.

Personal life
Lovejoy married Avery Eyre in 2010. Avery also went to Dartmouth College where she was captain of the squash team. They have three daughters. His parents are Carl and Cari Lovejoy. Ben is the eldest of their three children. His father played hockey for Colby College, and his mother was a two-time All-American and all-time leading-scorer in lacrosse at UMass. She also played field hockey and raced for the UMASS ski team. Cari has been inducted into the UMASS Hall of Fame. Lovejoy has two younger brothers, both of whom played college sports. Brother Nick played hockey and lacrosse for Dartmouth College, and Matt was an All-American lacrosse player for the University of Virginia.

On December 7, 2017, Lovejoy announced he would be donating his brain to concussion research, becoming the first active NHL player to do so.

Career statistics

Awards and honors

References

External links
 
 Pens Universe interviews Ben Lovejoy

1984 births
Living people
American men's ice hockey defensemen
Anaheim Ducks players
Boston College Eagles men's ice hockey players
Dallas Stars players
Dartmouth Big Green men's ice hockey players
Ice hockey people from New Hampshire
New Jersey Devils players
Norfolk Admirals players
Pittsburgh Penguins players
Sportspeople from Concord, New Hampshire
Stanley Cup champions
Undrafted National Hockey League players
Wilkes-Barre/Scranton Penguins players